A babau is the eastern Mediterranean equivalent of a bogeyman.

Babau may also refer to:

Babau (Dungeons & Dragons), creature in Dungeons & Dragons
Baubau, city in Indonesia